"Lettre à France" is a single by French singer Michel Polnareff that was released in 1977. The artist had been living in California since 1973, in part due to financial problems. The song, whose title means "Letter to France" in English, is about living in exile, and is a love song to his home country.

The single sold 476 000 copies, allowing Polnareff to return to France to partially resolve his tax problems.

Track listing 
A side: "Lettre à France" — 4:38
B side: "Mademoiselle De" — 3:40

Charts

Weekly charts

Year-end charts

Musicians 
 Michel Polnareff
 David Hentschel
 Joe Patridge
 Ronnie Caryl

References 

1977 singles
Michel Polnareff songs
1977 songs
Songs written by Michel Polnareff
Atlantic Records singles